Anne E. Wojcicki (born July 28, 1973) is an American entrepreneur who co-founded and serves as CEO of the personal genomics company 23andMe. She founded the company in 2006 with Linda Avey and Paul Cusenza to provide the general public access to their genetic information. She is a co-founder and board member of the Breakthrough Prize. Wojcicki married Google co-founder Sergey Brin in 2007, and divorced eight years later.

Early life and education
Wojcicki was born in Palo Alto, California, and has two older sisters—Susan Wojcicki, former CEO of YouTube, and Janet Wojcicki, an anthropologist and epidemiologist. Her parents are Esther Wojcicki (née Hochman), an educator and journalist, and Stanley Wojcicki, a Polish-born physics professor emeritus at Stanford University. The three sisters grew up on Stanford's campus. When she was fourteen, she learned how to figure skate, and later started playing ice hockey.

Wojcicki attended Gunn High School in Palo Alto, California, where she edited the school newspaper The Oracle, and won a scholarship for her sports stories. She received a bachelor of science in biology at Yale University in 1996. During her time there she played on the varsity women's ice hockey team. She conducted molecular biology research at the National Institutes of Health and at the University of California, San Diego.

Career
After graduating, Wojcicki worked as a health care consultant at Passport Capital, a San Francisco-based investment fund and at Investor AB. She was a health care investment analyst for four years, overseeing health care investments, focusing on biotechnology companies. Disillusioned by the culture of Wall Street and its attitude towards health care, she decided to forego taking the MCAT to enroll in medical school and instead decided to focus on biological research.

Wojcicki is best known as the co-founder and CEO of 23andMe, a direct to consumer DNA testing company, which allows for consumers to test for ancestry and health risks. She founded the company in 2006 with Linda Avey and Paul Cusenza with a goal of providing common people access to their genetic information, which could further provide information on cures for diseases or treatments, especially with the help of Glaxo and their $300 million investment. Wojcicki has expressed interest in “revolutioniz[ing] health care” with DNA testing, as it could provide consumers with enough information to predict potential genetic illnesses.

Consumers can purchase testing kits for $99, $199, and $499 which provide information on ancestry, health, and genetic traits. The company takes saliva samples that are mailed in by buyers, and processes the genetic information, posting the results online for the buyer to view.

The company is named for the 23 pairs of chromosomes in a normal human cell. The company's personal genome test kit was named "Invention of the Year" by Time magazine in 2008. Beginning in 2015, the Food and Drug Administration started to give approval to 23andMe's health-related tests, including risk from cystic fibrosis, sickle cell anemia, certain cancers, Alzheimer's, Parkinson's, and coeliac disease. In 2018, 23andMe entered into a four-year collaboration with GlaxoSmithKline to develop new medicines.

Wojcicki is a member of the Xconomists, an ad hoc team of editorial advisors for the tech news and media company Xconomy. In October 2013, Fast Company named Wojcicki "The Most Daring CEO". She is a co-founder and board member of the Breakthrough Prize. As of 2020, she is listed as number 93 in Forbes list of the World's 100 Most Powerful Women. In August 2021 Wojcicki joined the board of Cazoo.

Wojcicki has been closely involved in the downtown business district of Los Altos, California. In approximately 2005, Wojcicki and her then husband Sergey Brin bought at least half a dozen commercial properties in downtown Los Altos. Under the name of Passerelle Investment Company, they sponsored events and urban planning initiatives throughout the downtown business district. In 2016, the firm was renamed to Los Altos Community Investments and given a tighter focus on commercial real-estate development. In 2021, Los Altos Community Investments opened a food hall in downtown Los Altos called the State Street Market.

Personal life
Wojcicki married Google co-founder Sergey Brin in May 2007. They have a son, born in 2008, and a daughter born in late 2011. They separated in 2013, and divorced in 2015. Brin and Wojcicki shared a family office called Bayshore Global Management to manage over $100 billion in assets, and jointly ran the Brin Wojcicki Foundation until 2017. They have donated extensively to the Michael J. Fox Foundation and in 2009 gave $1 million to support the Hebrew Immigrant Aid Society. She joined The Giving Pledge in 2022, committing to donating most of her wealth.

Her grandfather, Franciszek Wójcicki, was a People's Party and Polish People's Party politician who had been elected MP during the 1947 Polish legislative election. Her grandmother, Janina Wójcicka Hoskins, was a Polish-American librarian at the Library of Congress who was responsible for building the largest collection of Polish material in the United States.

References

1973 births
American people of Polish descent
American people of Russian-Jewish descent
American technology company founders
American women in business
Businesspeople from California
People from San Mateo County, California
American women company founders
Yale Bulldogs women's ice hockey players
American philanthropists
People from Palo Alto, California
American health care businesspeople
People from Los Altos Hills, California
Y Combinator people
21st-century American biologists
Gunn High School alumni
21st-century American women scientists
Living people